Olympic Gold Quest (OGQ) is a program of the Foundation for Promotion of Sports and Games, a Not for Profit (Section 25) Company, which is committed to bridging the gap between the best athletes in India and the best athletes in the world thus helping Indian athletes to win Olympic Gold medals.

OGQ aims to create a level playing field for Indian athletes to enable them to be competitive at the highest level of sport. Founded by Indian sporting legends Geet Sethi and Prakash Padukone, OGQ's first test was the London 2012 Olympics. 4 out of the 6 Indian medalists were supported by OGQ. In 2010, Leander Paes and Viswanathan Anand also joined the board of directors. Viren Rasquinha, former India hockey captain, is the current CEO of Olympic Gold Quest.

Objective
To assist potential Olympic medal talent from India to help achieve their dreams and win Olympic gold medals and scout for potential medal talent, to help identify areas of support, to work with all stakeholders to aid deserving talent.

Olympic Gold Quest strives to complement the efforts of the Indian Government and various Sports Federations in identifying and funding the best and most deserving medal prospects for the Olympic Games. Olympic Gold Quest has brought together eminent sportsperson, business leaders, sportswriters and talent scouts to identify emerging athletes, understand their training needs and requirements and raise funds to be used for supporting athletes with Olympic medal winning potential.

Supported athletes

Olympic Gold Quest supports 51 athletes in the six disciplines of athletics,  badminton, boxing, shooting, wrestling, and archery. Besides it also supports 25 junior athletes from different sports disciplines under its Junior Scholarship Program.

Following are the athletes:

Archery 
 Deepika Kumari
 Jayanta Talukdar
 Tarundeep Rai
 Rahul Banerjee
 Bombayla Devi Laishram
 Rimil Buriuly
 Laxmirani Majhi
 Mangal Singh Champia
 Sanjay Boro
 Atanu Das
Pravin Jadhav
Atul Verma
Promila Daimary
Madhu Vedwan
Ankita Bhakat
Sukhmani Babrekar

Athletics
 Vikas Gowda
 K. T. Irfan
 Sandeep Kumar
 Annu Rani

Badminton
 Saina Nehwal (bronze in 2012)
 P V Sindhu (silver in 2016 and bronze in 2020) 
 Parupalli Kashyap
 Jwala Gutta and Ashwini Ponnappa

Boxing
 Mary Kom (bronze in 2012)
 Shiva Thapa
 Nengneihat Kom
 Sarita Devi
 Devendro Singh
 Sarjubala Devi
 Sumit Sangwan

Shooting
 Gagan Narang (bronze in 2012)
 Vijay Kumar (silver in 2012)
 Heena Sidhu
 Annu Raj Singh
 Sanjeev Rajput
 Omkar Singh
 Jitu Rai
 Pooja Ghatkar
 Ayonika Paul
 Shweta Singh
 Smit Singh
 Prakash Nanjappa
 Kynan Chenai
 Joydeep Karmakar
 Rahi Sarnobat
 Apurvi Chandela
 Chain Singh
 Elizabeth Koshy
 Lajja Gauswami
 Shri Nivetha Parmantham
 Gurpreet Singh 
 Shreya Gawande
 Angad Vir Singh Bajwa
 Anish Bhanwala
 Ravi Kumar
 Deepak Kumar
 Shahzar Rizvi

Wrestling 
 Jaideep
 Parveen Rana
 Sonam Malik
 Sushil Kumar (Silver in 2012, Bronze in 2008)  (Disc. 2016)
 Yogeshwar Dutt (Bronze in 2012) (Disc. 2016)

Junior Scholarship Athletes 
 Malaika Goel - Shooting  
 Pratik Borse - Shooting 
 Manavaditya Rathore - Shooting
 Gayatri Pawaskar - Shooting  
 Lakshya Sen - Badminton 
 Siril Verma - Badminton 
 Meiraba Luwang - Badminton 
 Rahul Yadav - Badminton 
 Kiran George - Badminton 
 Chirag Sen - Badminton 
 Rahul Bharadwaj - Badminton 
 Bodhit Joshi - Badminton 
 Kartikey Gulshan - Badminton 
 Aakarshi Kashyap - Badminton 
 Rohit Singh - Boxing 
 Parechitpi - Boxing 
 Thotyola Tangkhul - Boxing 
 Nengboichong - Boxing 
 Lansigmi - Boxing 
 Ngathingpam - Boxing 
 Shantikumar - Boxing 
 Ravi Kumar - Wrestling 
 Anil Kumar - Wrestling 
 Naveen - Wrestling 
 Manisha - Wrestling 
 Pooja Gehlot - Wrestling 
 Arun Singh - Wrestling 
 Archana Kamath - Table Tennis
 Diya Chitale - Table Tennis 
 Maana Patel - Swimming
Shaili Singh - Long Jump
Kunwar Ajay - Javelin Throw 
Komalika Bari - Archery

Paralympians 

 Devendra Jhajharia - Javelin Throw
Mariyappan Thangavelu - High Jump

Medals

See also 
 Anglian Medal Hunt Company
 Mittal Champions Trust

References

External links 
 Olympic Gold Quest website

Sports organisations of India
Non-profit organisations based in India
India at the Olympics